The Battle of Galați was a military engagement between the formerly allied Romanian and Russian troops at the end of World War I, as the former sought to prevent the latter from retreating from the armistice line along with their equipment.

Background

Romania was neutral for the first two years of World War I, but with the signing of the Treaty of Bucharest Romania joined the Entente Powers and declared war on 27 August 1916. After initial advances the Romanian military campaign quickly turned disastrous for Romania as the Central Powers occupied two-thirds of the country, including the capital Bucharest, within months and Russian troops were dispatched to the new front line in order to prop up the Romanian government and prevent an invasion of Russia from the south. Galați, the last port on the Romanian Danube River, was a vital lifeline for supplying the rump Romanian territory and the Russian Bessarabia Governorate and it remained on the Entente side of the front lines.

The 1917 February Revolution in Russia forced Tsar Nicholas II to abdicate but the Russian Provisional Government under Alexander Kerensky decided to continue the war on the Entente side though the battle lines remained mostly stalemated.

In the summer of 1917, the Romanian front saw one of the largest concentrations of combat forces and war matériel assembled during World War I: nine armies, 80 infantry divisions with 974 battalions, 19 cavalry divisions with 550 squadrons and 923 artillery batteries, whose effectives amounted to some 800,000 men, with about one million in their immediate reserve. Under Allied pressure to continue the war, Russia launched what became known as the Kerensky Offensive against the Central Powers. During this offensive Romania took part in three battles at Mărăști, Mărășești and Oituz, preventing a significant advance of the enemy troops.

The Battle of Mărăști began on 24 July 1917 in the sector of the Romanian Second Army, the Russian Fourth Army, and the Russian Ninth Army. Initiated by surprise with three divisions, the offensive succeeded in disrupting the well-organized enemy defenses and compelling the Austro-Hungarians and Germans to retreat. But the two Russian Armies remained on Romanian soil.

When the October Revolution in Russia brought Vladimir Lenin to power, he immediately started negotiating a peace with the Germans that culminated with the 15 December 1917 armistice between Soviet Russia and the Central Powers. The Romanians separately negotiated the Armistice of Focșani, but millions of German and Russian soldiers still faced off across Romania.

The Russian Army, led by General Dmitry Shcherbachev, was headquartered in the Socola quarter of Iași, the Romanian capital-in-exile. The Russian army had begun disintegrating after the issuance of order No. 1 in February, but the pace increased after the armistice. Russian soldiers turned into brigands who often killed their officers, elected revolutionary committees and started looting, killing, and raping Romanian civilians. Shcherbachev lost control of most non-deserting Russian units to Bolshevik revolutionaries. Shcherbachev wrote to the Prime Minister of Romania, Ion I. C. Brătianu: "Russian armies have become gangs without leaders, poisoned with violent anarchy, unable to keep the front and incapable of organizing demobilization for withdrawal that without supply is itself a devastating work." But to his request for support Brătianu replied: "I can not raise any Romanian soldier to defend you against your own troops without seeing me mixed fighting in Russia without causing a conflict with the new rulers." But Romania would soon have to fight the Russians anyway.

In December 1917, radical Bolsheviks in Petrograd instigated a campaign to organize and initiate a Bolshevik revolution in Romania and Bessarabia. The Bolsheviks installed cannons overlooking the Romanian capital-in-exile. On 22 December 1917, Romanian soldiers attacked a camp of Bolsheviks and sent them on a train back to Russia. The next day another train filled with Bolshevik troops left Odessa but was turned back at the Prut River by Romanian soldiers. The next day a bomb was defused at the residence which was being used as the Royal House of King Ferdinand I of Romania.

Disintegration of the Russian Army
Because of so many Russian troops still positioned on the front lines, the Romanian government started to take precautions in the rest of the country. The territory behind the front was divided into eight regions with military commands (Botoșani, Fălticeni, Iași, Podu Iloaiei, Roman, Vaslui, Bacău, and Bârlad) that reinforced the local gendarmerie with military units that hunted and deported the Russian gangs that roamed and plundered the land. The smaller groups were easily neutralized and sent across the Prut. Sporadic clashes occurred when guns were brought into action, but in most cases the incidents were solved peacefully.

The same could always not be said about cases of desertion and the cases of large units, divisions, or battalions leaving the front. Where possible, they were disarmed peacefully, then sent by train back to Russia. The Romanian orders from General Constantin Prezan were clear: No Russian unit could leave the front to go back to Russia without written approval from the Russian high command. The units that moved on their own initiative and without a precise order were to be disarmed. The orders also stated that Russian units should not be bullied and that Russian soldiers should be treated fairly and with dignity. But "all who live and move in this country, regardless of nationality, must comply with our laws and public order". The Romanian government's greatest fear was the Bolshevization of Romania.

On 12 January 1918 at Pechea, northwest of Galați, a delegation of the Russian 13th Division came to the 4th Romanian Division headquarters to announce that the next day, Russian troops would leave the front and cross the Prut River to the Moldavian Republic. General Shcherbachev ordered his troops to remain in the position, but was told that the Russians soldiers no longer recognized him as their commander and would leave for Russian soil. If Romanian troops resisted the move, the soldiers promised to destroy everything in their path.

Stationed on the front line between Tecuci and Galați was the Russian Sixth Army with approximately 35,000 troops. The 4th Romanian Division was placed behind to oversee them. After receiving the Russian ultimatum, the 4th Division started preparing and got two battalions with machine guns and artillery from the neighboring 13th Division to help. On 16 January 1918 the Russian 40th division started moving towards Bessarabia and crossed the Prut. The next day the Russian 12th Division started its withdrawal near Pechea, but returned to the front when blocked by the 4th Romanian Division. On 18 January 1918 the 9th Division of General Eugen Iskritsky's Siberian Corps started moving towards Galați where the 10th Division was already encamped. The 9th Division was filled with 6,000 soldiers dedicated to the cause of Bolshevism.

Battle for Galați

For the citizens of Galați, the situation was alarming. The Siberian Corps had more soldiers than Galați had citizens. The Romanian archives speak for no more than 500 soldiers in all Romanian detachments. Romanian Navy Commander , the Galați sector commander, received an order to bar the road from the west from the Russian columns and to defend the city. Two Romanian companies and half of Regiment 21 defended the western approach to the city on Țiglina Hill. In central Galați there were a detachment of Marines and two platoons of infantry. Two small detachments were deployed at Filești to watch the northern approach and to the east to guard the approach from Bessarabia. From the Romanian Danube Flotilla, there were four patrol boats, a torpedo boat, and a dinghy stationed on the Danube. Colonel Bădescu, commander of the 8th Brigade in Fântânele, had the mission to attack from the north and west of the Russian columns, located in the gorge of swamps Lake Mălina, Lake Cătușa, and the Siret River. The Russians forces were disproportionately far more numerous and better prepared.

On 19 January the Russian 9th Division swept through a small Romanian detachment at Șendreni and arrived at Movileni where they set up artillery. A Russian delegation went to Galați and asked Niculescu-Rizea to allow the Russian troops to pass through the city towards Bessarabia. Niculescu-Rizea replied that his order was to stop that action. The Russians gave an ultimatum. If they were not allowed to pass by 3 in the afternoon they would begin shelling Galați.

For 15 hours the Russian batteries near Movileni opened fire. Bombs fell in the city center, but they caused minimal damage because the Russians were firing at random. The archives do not note any casualties among the civilian population. The greater danger that night for the population was the attempt by the 10th Division to burn the city by filling cars with gasoline and driving flaming vehicles into buildings. During the day on 20 January, Romanian batteries returned the Russian fire from Movileni.

On 21 January the Russians continued bombing Galați. Russians occupied the bogs west of Lake Cătușa. A strong Russian detachment managed to capture one officer and 14 soldiers on Țiglina Hill. The Russian 34th Regiment attacked Filești. A Russian heavy battery and six machine guns were placed on Giurgiulești hill on the banks of the Prut and a Russian squadron consisting of two companies of machine guns, a cavalry squadron and a battery of artillery, crossed the Prut River, advancing toward Galați. They disarmed the Romanian border guards and militia posts. They placed artillery near . Russian infantry, preceded by cavalry patrols, entered the city, where it bolstered over 200 armed infantry of the 10th Division. A Russian gunboat, armed with a 150 mm cannon came upstream from Reni. From Giurgiulești artillery shells dropped on Galați.

On 22 January the Romanians counterattacked. The Romanian 8th Brigade, arrived from Fântânele and surprised the Russian troops stationed in the bog north of Movileni. The Romanian ships on the Danube, batteries on the south bank, and two Romanian airplanes dropped bombs on the Russians. Romanian infantry led a bayonet charge up Țiglina Hill, freed the captured Romanians and sent the Russians on the run. The Filești detachment captured two platoons of infantry and a machine-gun section. Attacked and expelled from the north and east, the Russians in disarray began moving south to the Gara Barboși and the bridge over Siret. Romanian artillery and bombers targeted bombs on the mass of Russian soldiers gathered there. A handful of soldiers created panic among Russians, so much so that two regiments, the 33rd and 35th, almost 3,000 soldiers, ran south and surrendered to the Germans.

By the end of the day the Russian troops agreed to surrender, were disarmed and sent off over the Prut to the Moldavian Democratic Republic.

Aftermath

Galați was not the only spot where Russian soldiers clashed with the Romanians. Over the next few days clashes between Russian and Romanian troops occurred in Bacău, Botoșani, Mihăileni, Pașcani, and Timișești. On 27 January the bloodiest clash occurred in Fălticeni. The Romanians lost 14 dead and 83 wounded. The Russians suffered over 100 dead and 500 wounded.

In February, Bolshevik bickering and dickering caused the Central Powers to repudiate the armistice on 18 February 1918, and in the next fortnight seized most of Ukraine, Belarus, and the Baltic countries in Operation Faustschlag. Romania was spared this attack.

By the end of March 1918, Romanian troops had entered the Moldavian Democratic Republic (mostly ethnical Romanian) and cleared it of Bolshevik troops. The National Council of the Moldavian Republic, Sfatul Țării, declared on 9 April 1918 the union with Romania. This union was recognized by the principal Allied Powers in the 1920 Treaty of Paris. The newly communist Russia did not recognize Romanian rule over Bessarabia, considering it an occupation of Russian territory.

Monument

The Battle of Galați was the only time in its history that Romania used air, land, and marine forces together in a single battle. It is also the only battle in history in which former Allied troops fought one another within eyesight of their former common enemy. 

On 25 May 1921 the city of Galați was awarded "La Croce di Guerra" by General Pietro Badoglio, Chief of Staff of the Italian Army, while French General Henri Berthelot presented it with "La Croix de Guerre". An arched monument was dedicated to the heroes of Galați, but it was torn down after the Communists took control of Romania after World War II.

References

Galați
Galați
Galați
History of Western Moldavia
History of Galați County
Galați
Galați
January 1918 events